The American Nuclear Society (ANS) is an international, not-for-profit organization of scientists, engineers, and industry professionals that promote the field of nuclear engineering and related disciplines.

ANS is composed of three communities: professional divisions, local sections/plant branches, and student sections. Individual members consist of fellows, professional members, and student members. Various organization members are also included in the Society including corporations, governmental agencies, educational institutions, and associations.

As of spring 2020, ANS is composed of more than 10,000 members from more than 40 countries. ANS is also a member of the International Nuclear Societies Council (INSC).

History 
The American Nuclear Society was founded in 1954 as a not-for-profit association to promote the growing nuclear field. Shortly thereafter in 1955, ANS held its first annual meeting and elected Walter Zinn as its first president. Originally headquartered in space provided by the Oak Ridge Institute of Nuclear Studies (ORINS), the Society's headquarters were moved to various locations over the years until 1977 in which the Society settled into its own headquarters building in La Grange Park, Illinois.

The American Nuclear Society published "Fusion technology : a journal of the American Nuclear Society and the European Nuclear Society" from 1984 to 2001.

Student sections 
The American Nuclear Society consists of student sections at colleges and universities throughout the United States and abroad. As of spring 2020, the table below lists the active student sections of ANS.

See also
 Alpha Nu Sigma
 Institute of Nuclear Materials Management
 Nuclear Energy Institute
 Guy Tavernier (fr)
 J. Ernest Wilkins, Jr.
 Margaret K. Butler

External links
 ANS Official Website

References

Professional associations based in the United States
Nuclear organizations
1954 establishments in the United States
Organizations established in 1954
501(c)(3) organizations